Léon Lommel (3 February 1893 – 11 June 1978) was a Luxembourgian prelate of the Roman Catholic Church. He served as Bishop of Luxembourg from 1956 to 1971.

Biography
Léon Lommel was born in Schleiderhof, as the son of a farmer. He studied in Echternach, Luxembourg, Rome, and Innsbruck, where he was ordained to the priesthood on 13 July 1919. Lommel later obtained his doctorate in philosophy and Licentiate in Theology, and taught philosophy and sacred art at the Seminary of Luxembourg.

As a canon of Luxembourg Cathedral, he worked with architect Hubert Schumacher on its expansion from 1935 to 1938. During World War II, he was sent to France after being interrogated by the Gestapo; he worked in reconstructing his country's churches and chapels after returning there following the end of the war.

On 14 May 1949 Lommel was appointed Coadjutor bishop of Luxembourg and Titular bishop of Nephelis by Pope Pius XII, receiving his episcopal consecration on the following 29 June from Fernando Cardinal Cento.

He later succeeded Joseph Philippe, SCI, as the seventh Bishop of Luxembourg upon the latter's death on 21 October 1956. From 1962 to 1965, Lommel attended the Second Vatican Council, in which he was an enthusiastic and engaged participant. The elderly Bishop retired on 13 February 1971, after fifteen years of service, passing on the governance of the diocese to his coadjutor, Bishop Jean Hengen.

Lommel died later died at the age of 85. He is buried in the crypt of the Cathedral of Luxembourg.

External links
Catholic-Hierarchy

1893 births
1978 deaths
20th-century Roman Catholic bishops in Luxembourg
Participants in the Second Vatican Council
Burials at Notre-Dame Cathedral, Luxembourg